Telephone Bill and the Smooth Operators is a UK musical group performing an original blend of folk/country/swing music. They formed in Cambridge, UK in the 1970s, split up in the 1980s, and re-formed to play at the 2001 Cambridge Folk Festival and thereafter.

History
Telephone Bill and the Smooth Operators formed in Cambridge, England in around 1975 as an amalgam of musicians from some previous local groups including "Baby Whale" and "Duke, Duke and the Dukes", several of whom (Nick Barraclough, Anne Baker and Gerry Hale) also worked with UK bluegrass musician and recording artist Pete Sayers. The group was/is fronted by Nick Barraclough (later a BBC country/folk presenter and producer) on guitar, 5-string banjo and vocals and also included virtuoso fiddle/mandolin player Gerry Hale (who later moved to Australia), singers and songwriters Anne Baker and Chris Cox, plus (at different times) Robb Appleton, Andy Metcalfe, Tony Shepherd and Richard Lee. Their music has roots in bluegrass, jazz and swing, plus original numbers with a style reminiscent of the "lazy swing" of Dan Hicks, and has been described as "sort of Americana, swingy, bluesy stuff with bags of harmony and whizzy playing"; their theme song, "Telephone Bill", being a re-write/extension of the Peter Rowan song "Panama Red" (originally written for the band New Riders of the Purple Sage). In their initial incarnation they toured widely, performed on UK television and BBC radio, and recorded 3 albums on the Swamp, Smooth and Dingle's record labels. In 2001 they re-formed to play at that year's Cambridge Folk Festival and meanwhile, also played gigs and released one album as "Nick Barraclough and the Burglars" (alias the "Burglars of Barcelona"). The present line-up comprises original members Nick Barraclough, Robb Appleton, Chris Cox and Steve Reynolds together with new member Paula Welham on sax, flute and vocals.

Discography

Albums
 Pretty Slick, Huh? Swamp Records WAM 679, 1979 album details
 Lounge Music Smooth Records DIAL 100, 1980 album details
 Manhattan Roll  Dingle's Records DID 713, 1982 album details
 (As Nick Barraclough and the Burglars): Daylight Robbery Gott Discs, 2007 album details
 Pioneering 2013 (details??)

Singles
 Manhattan Roll / You Got To Believe Weekend Records DJS 10785, 1977
 Cruisin' / Pinball Wizard'  Weekend Records DJS 10858, 1977
 Wanna See Your Telephone Bill / Pioneering / Hollywood (You Kiss While You're Dancing) / If I Had My Way Weekend Records DJS 10885 (EP), 1978
 Boogie Woogie Piggie Smooth Records Ring 1 (promo), 197?

References

British folk music groups